Lonsdale Ragg (23 October 1866 in Wellington, Shropshire – 31 July 1945 in Bath) was an Anglican priest author.

Ragg was educated at Adams' Grammar School, Christ Church, Oxford  and Ripon College Cuddesdon; Cuddesdon Theological College; and ordained in 1889.

After a curacy at All Saints', Oxford he was a tutor at Christ Church then vice-principal of Cuddesdon He was warden of Bishop's Hostel, Lincoln and vice-chancellor of Lincoln Cathedral from 1899 to 1903. After this he was at various times Chaplain in Bologna, Venice, Valescure, Bordighera, Cannes and Rome. He became Archdeacon of Gibraltar and held the post until his death.

References

External links
 

1866 births
Clergy from Shropshire
Alumni of Christ Church, Oxford
Alumni of Ripon College Cuddesdon
1945 deaths
People educated at Adams' Grammar School
Archdeacons of Gibraltar
Writers from Shropshire